Our Lady of Good Health Church, is a Marian shrine built in the Indo-Dravida style that opened in 2005 in Medan, Indonesia. It is devoted to Our Lady of Good Health ( Ārōkkiya mātā), a Marian apparition dating from the 17th century in Velankanni, Tamil Nadu. The shrine is two floors high and has a small seven-floor tower in the Indonesian style. It is located on Jl. Sakura III, beside Jl. Simatupang. It is an important pilgrimage site in Asia.

References

External links
 Gereja Bunda Velangkanni Bunda Penyembuh

Roman Catholic churches in Indonesia
Tourist attractions in North Sumatra
Churches in Sumatra
Buildings and structures in Medan
Roman Catholic churches completed in 2005